The women's 100 metre backstroke event at the 2020 Summer Olympics was held from 25 to 27 July 2021 at the Tokyo Aquatics Centre. It was the event's twenty-third consecutive appearance, having been held at every edition since 1924. An unusual occurrence happened where the Olympic record for this event was broken three times in a single day and five times through the course of the entire competition.

Records
Prior to this competition, the existing world and Olympic records were as follows.

The following records were established during the competition:

Qualification

 
The Olympic Qualifying Time for the event was 1:00.25. Up to two swimmers per National Olympic Committee (NOC) could automatically qualify by swimming that time at an approved qualification event. The Olympic Selection Time was 1:02.06. Up to one swimmer per NOC meeting that time was eligible for selection, allocated by world ranking until the maximum quota for all swimming events is reached. NOCs without a female swimmer qualified in any event could also use their universality place.

Competition format

The competition consisted of three rounds: heats, semifinals, and a final. The swimmers with the best 16 times in the heats advanced to the semifinals. The swimmers with the best 8 times in the semifinals advanced to the final.

Schedule
All times are Japan Standard Time (UTC+9)

Results

Heats
The swimmers with the top 16 times, regardless of heat, advanced to the semifinals.

Semifinals

The swimmers with the best 8 times, regardless of heat, advanced to the final.

Final

References

Women's 00100 metre backstroke
Olympics
Women's events at the 2020 Summer Olympics
2021 in women's swimming